Hirasa is a geometer moth genus of tribe Gnophini in the subfamily Ennominae. The genus was erected by Frederic Moore in 1888.

Species include:
 Hirasa pauperus (Butler, 1881)
 Hirasa scripturaria (Walker, 1866)
 Hirasa theuropides (Oberthür, 1891)

References

Geometridae